is a railway line in Kyushu, Japan, operated by the Kyushu Railway Company (JR Kyushu). It connects Uto Station in Uto, Kumamoto Prefecture with Misumi Station in Uki, Kumamoto Prefecture.

Station list

History
The Kyushu Railway Co. opened the entire line in 1899, and was nationalised in 1907.

Freight services ceased in 1982.

References

Lines of Kyushu Railway Company
1067 mm gauge railways in Japan